Baton Rouge is the capital city of Louisiana, in the United States. Situated on the Mississippi River, it is the second-largest city in Louisiana, with New Orleans as the largest Louisiana city. The population sits at 225,362. 

In Baton Rouge there are many tall buildings. The eleven tallest buildings are as follows: Louisiana State Capitol, One American Place, Chase Tower, Riverside Tower North, Marriott Hotel Baton Rouge, Memorial Tower, Mid-City Tower, St. Joseph Cathedral, Louisiana State Office Building, Jacobs Plaza, Hilton Baton Rouge Capitol Centre. 

This article is a list of the eleven tallest buildings in the city of Baton Rouge, Louisiana.

See also
 List of tallest buildings in Louisiana

References

External links
Emporis.com - Baton Rouge
Baton Rouge and Environs

 
Baton Rouge
Tallest in Baton Rouge